Joseph Carl Hafele (25 July 1933 – 15 November 2014) was an American physicist best known for the Hafele–Keating experiment, a test of Einstein's theory of general relativity.

Hafele was an apprentice welder when he was drafted to serve in the army during the Korean War. After the war, he obtained undergraduate and graduate degrees from the University of Illinois at Urbana-Champaign, earning his PhD in 1962 with a thesis on a topic in nuclear physics. He married Carol Hessling in 1958, and they had four daughters. He worked at Los Alamos National Laboratory, and then Washington University in St. Louis from 1966 to 1972. In 1971 he performed the Hafele-Keating experiment along with astronomer Richard E. Keating. He later worked at Caterpillar, Eureka College, NASA (Langley Air Force Base), and Christopher Newport University. After his retirement in 1996 he and his wife lived in Laramie, Wyoming, where he continued theoretical work on the interpretation of experiments that might indicate anomalies in relativity. He died in 2014 during surgery.

Publications
 
 
 </ref>

References

American physicists
Christopher Newport University
Washington University in St. Louis faculty
Washington University physicists